Jacobu is the capital town of Amansie Central, a district in the Ashanti Region of Ghana. It is near Bekwai. Jacobu and its neighbouring towns form the [[Odotobri (Ghana parliament constituency)
|Odotobri]] paramountcy.

The current chief of Jacobu is Nana Fosu Kwadjobri. Jacobu is rich in resources including gold and timber, and also exports most Ghanaian foodstuffs, as the people are farmers. The town is known for the Jacobu Secondary Technical School, which is a second cycle institution.

References

Populated places in the Ashanti Region